Rashaad Galant (8 September 1947 – 6 January 2014) was a South African cricketer. He played fifteen first-class matches for Transvaal (SACB) between 1982 and 1986.

Career 
Rashaad Galant began playing for Transvaal at age 35. Galant ended his career in 1986 at age 39.

References

External links
 

1947 births
2014 deaths
South African cricketers
Gauteng cricketers
Cricketers from Cape Town